Benjamin Ijalana (born August 6, 1989) is a former American football offensive tackle. He played  college football for Villanova and was drafted by the Indianapolis Colts in the second round of the 2011 NFL Draft.

Early years
Ijalana's parents immigrated to the U.S. from Nigeria.  A native of New Brunswick, New Jersey, Ijalana attended Willingboro High School in his freshman and sophomore year, before moving to Hainesport Township and transferring to Rancocas Valley Regional High School, where he was a two-way lineman, and district champion in wrestling.

College career
He started every game at left tackle since his true freshman year at Villanova.

Ijalana was named to the 2010 Outland Trophy watch list as the only Football Championship Subdivision player.

Professional career

2011 NFL Draft
The Sporting News listed Ijalana as one of the five most "intriguing small-school prospects". He was selected 49th overall by the Indianapolis Colts in the 2011 NFL Draft, the highest selected Villanova Wildcat since Howie Long in 1981.

Entering draft day, Ijalana was listed as a second round prospect with the possibility of jumping into the first round. He was projected as a right tackle, following his strong showing as a left tackle in college and his good arm length and hand size. Additionally, he had the ability to fall back as a guard. On day two of the draft, the Indianapolis Colts traded their 53rd and 152nd pick to the Redskins for the 49th pick to draft Ijalana.

Indianapolis Colts
Ijalana played four games in his rookie season before tearing his ACL and landing on injured reserve.

A few weeks after being cleared to play, Ijalana tore his ACL again during training camp in 2012. Ijalana was eventually declared out for the 2012 season. He was waived/injured on August 1, 2012, and he was subsequently placed on injured reserve on August 5.

New York Jets
Ijalala was claimed off waivers by the New York Jets on September 1, 2013. On April 9, 2016, Ijalana signed a one-year contract extension with the Jets. On March 9, 2017, Ijalana signed a two-year, $11 million contract extension with the Jets.

On February 19, 2018, the Jets declined the second-year option on Ijalana's contract, making him a free agent. However on March 16, 2018, Ijalana re-signed with the Jets on a one-year deal. He was placed on injured reserve on August 15, 2018.

Jacksonville Jaguars
On August 11, 2019, Ijalana was signed by the Jacksonville Jaguars. He was placed on injured reserve on August 31, 2019.

Executive career
On June 3, 2022, Ijalana was hired by the Philadelphia Eagles as a scouting assistant.

References

External links
 
 Villanova Wildcats bio
 New York Jets bio

1989 births
Living people
American sportspeople of Nigerian descent
People from Hainesport Township, New Jersey
People from Willingboro Township, New Jersey
Sportspeople from Burlington County, New Jersey
Sportspeople from New Brunswick, New Jersey
Players of American football from New Jersey
Nigerian players of American football
American football offensive tackles
American football offensive guards
Rancocas Valley Regional High School alumni
Villanova Wildcats football players
Willingboro High School alumni
Indianapolis Colts players
New York Jets players
Jacksonville Jaguars players